Haft Sang ("Seven stones") is an Iranian television series by the Islamic Republic of Iran Broadcasting (IRIB). It began airing in 2014, one day after the beginning of Ramadan. It is an unauthorised adaptation (or, as some commentators say, shot-for-shot copy) of the American television series Modern Family. 20th Century Fox did not authorize the production of this series, due to the economic sanctions by the U.S. against Iran.

The show is named after "haft sang" or lagori, a children's game. Each episode is around 40 to 50 minutes long, twice as long as each episode of the original American version. As a result, the series has been said to have a slower pace compared to the American version. Some subplots in the American version are not present in Haft Sang, such as the ones that pertain to homosexuality or dating.

Characters

*Portrayal of friendships between boys and girls is not permitted on Iranian television. As such, the character of Haley Dunphy is replaced by that of a teenage boy, Amir. Haley's boyfriend, Dylan, is accordingly changed to Anoush, Amir's friend.

**Due to complications in televising homosexuality in Iran, the Iranian equivalents of Mitch and Cam are a heterosexual couple, Behrooz and Elham. Accordingly, the reason for them adopting a child is due to Elham's infertility.

References

External links
 "Can you guess the difference between Iran’s Modern Family remake and the original?." Pink News.
YouTube video comparing Modern Family and Haft Sang frame-by-frame.

2014 Iranian television series debuts
2014 Iranian television series endings
Iranian television series
2010s comedy television series
Modern Family
Non-American television series based on American television series
Television series about families
Television series by 20th Century Fox Television
Islamic Republic of Iran Broadcasting original programming